An eight-segment display is a type of display based on eight segments that can be turned on or off according to the font pattern to be produced.

It is similar to a nine-segment display whose middle vertical bars are vertical, except that on an eight-segment display, the bars F and G are merged.

Applications
One application was in the Sharp EL-8, an early electronic calculator. The eight-segment display produces more rounded digits than a seven-segment display, yielding a more "script-like" output, with the trade-off that fewer possible alphabetic characters can be displayed because the bars F and G are merged (see table below).

Displaying 
An eight segment display can sometimes display alphabetic characters with less readability because the segments F and G are combined and the corners are rounded. The asymmetrical layout of the elements produced a distinctive "handwritten" digit style, with a half-height "0".

Because of graphical confusion, it is unable to display the following characters:

Examples

See also 
 Seven-segment display
 Nine-segment display
 Fourteen-segment display
 Sixteen-segment display
 Dot matrix display
 Vacuum fluorescent display

Display technology